Acrolepia syrphacopis is a moth of the  family Acrolepiidae. It was described by Edward Meyrick in 1919. It is found in South America.

References

Moths described in 1919
Acrolepiidae